Orle (in older sources also Orlje) is a settlement in central Slovenia. It lies in the hills southeast of the capital Ljubljana in the  Municipality of Škofljica. The municipality is part of the traditional region of Lower Carniola and is now included in the Central Slovenia Statistical Region.

Name
Orle was attested in historical sources as Orle in 1444, Arel in 1461, and Orll in 1496.

References

External links

Orle on Geopedia

Populated places in the Municipality of Škofljica